Yongning is a town under the administration of Yanqi Hui Autonomous County, Xinjiang, China. , it has 2 residential communities and 8 villages under its administration.

References 

Township-level divisions of Xinjiang
Yanqi Hui Autonomous County